The Navy of the Kingdom of Serbs, Croats and Slovenes – from 1929, the Royal Yugoslav Navy (КМ) – included a wide range of vessels during its existence from 1920 to 1945. This list includes all sea-going warships ranging from a light cruiser down to motor torpedo boats (MTBs), and also includes river monitors that operated on the Danube and other rivers. Large auxiliary vessels such as submarine tenders and tankers are included, but hulks, tugs and smaller auxiliary craft are not.

The KM was formed in 1920, but it was not until March 1921 that a number of former Austro-Hungarian vessels were transferred, some of which were already obsolete. The only modern seagoing warships transferred were twelve torpedo boats. Little was done to improve the fleet during the 1920s, but fleet modernisation was underway from the early 1930s, with a British-made flotilla leader followed by a class of modern French-designed destroyers and German-built MTBs. Almost all of the fleet was captured by the Axis powers during the April 1941 invasion of Yugoslavia, but a few vessels escaped to form the KM-in-exile, which operated under British supervision. Later in the war, several vessels that had been in Italian service were returned to the KM-in-exile, and these were joined by a British corvette. At the end of the war, these vessels were transferred to the fledgling Yugoslav Navy.

Coastal defence ship

The former  had been completed as an ironclad warship in 1889. She was an obsolete coastal defence ship when acquired by the Navy of the Serbs, Croats and Slovenes in 1921, and was scrapped the following year.

Light cruiser

The former  light cruiser  had been commissioned into the Imperial German Navy in 1900, so by 1941, Dalmacija was obsolete and was being used as a gunnery training ship. Captured by the Italians during the April 1941 invasion of Yugoslavia, she was put into service in the Royal Italian Navy as Cattaro. She was captured from the Italians by the Germans after the Italian armistice with the Allies in September 1943, and served in the German Navy as Niobe. She also served in the Navy of the Independent State of Croatia as Zniam before being lost in December 1943.

Destroyers

Dubrovnik
Dubrovnik was a flotilla leader built by a British shipyard in 1930–1931. Captured by the Italians in April 1941 she was put into service as Premuda, and was the most important and effective Italian war prize ship of World War II. She was captured by the Germans after the Italian armistice and served as TA32 until she was scuttled near the end of the war.

Beograd class
The  were French-designed destroyers completed in 1937–1938. Zagreb was scuttled during the Axis invasion of Yugoslavia, but Beograd and Ljubljana fell into Italian hands. They served with the Italians as Sebenico and Lubiana respectively. Lubiana was lost in April 1943, but Sebenico was captured by the Germans after the Italian capitulation, and saw service as TA43 until she was scuttled at the end of the war.

Corvette

In early 1944, the Royal Navy  HMS Mallow was transferred to the Royal Yugoslav Navy-in-exile (KM-in-exile) and renamed Nada. At the conclusion of the war she was transferred to the new Yugoslav Navy and renamed Partizanka.

Gunboat and royal yacht
The gunboat and royal yacht Beli Orao came into service in 1939 and was captured by the Italians in April 1941 during the invasion. She saw service with the Italians as Alba then Zagabria before being returned to the KM-in-exile in late 1943. She survived the war and was transferred to the new Yugoslav Navy.

Torpedo boats

250t class

Eight former Austro-Hungarian s were transferred to the KM in 1921, and were the KM's only modern sea-going warships when it was formed. Two were lost or scrapped prior to World War II, and the rest were captured by the Italians during the 1941 Axis invasion and put into service by them. After the Italian capitulation, two were returned to the KM-in-exile. A further ship was sunk by German aircraft while still in Italian hands, and another was scuttled by her Italian crew. Of the remaining two, one was transferred to the Navy of the Independent State of Croatia and was sunk in 1944, and the other served in the German Navy as TA48 and was sunk in early 1945. The two boats that were returned to the KM-in-exile were transferred to the Yugoslav Navy at the end of the war and served as Golešnica and Cer.

Kaiman class

Four former Austro-Hungarian s were transferred to the KM in 1921, but all four were discarded and broken up between 1928 and 1930.

Motor torpedo boats

Uskok class
Two British-built s were acquired by the KM in 1927. Both were captured by the Italians during the April 1941 invasion. Placed into service with new designations, they were both were lost or stricken while in Italian service.

Orjen class

Eight German-built s were purchased from Nazi Germany in the mid-to-late 1930s. Two escaped during the invasion of Yugoslavia in April 1941, and became part of the KM-in-exile. The remaining six were captured by the Italians and put into service by them under new designations. Two were scuttled by their crews at the time of the Italian capitulation in September 1943, and the remaining four were captured by the Germans and renamed. All four were scuttled at Salonika in October 1944. The boats that had escaped were transferred to the Yugoslav Navy at the end of the war.

Submarines

Hrabri class

Two British-made s were brought into service in 1927. During the April 1941 invasion, one escaped to join the KM-in-exile, while the other was captured by the Italians then scrapped. The boat that escaped was used as an anti-submarine warfare training vessel, and was transferred to the Yugoslav Navy at the end of the war and renamed Tara.

Osvetnik class
Two French-made s were commissioned in 1928–1929. Both were captured by the Italians during the April 1941 invasion, after which they were put into service as training and experimentation boats under new names. They were both scuttled at the time of the Italian capitulation.

Minelayers

Galeb class

Six German-built s were purchased soon after the KM was established. All six were captured by the Italians during the April 1941 invasion, and were put into service by them under new names. Five were lost prior to the Italian capitulation in September 1943, but one was transferred to the KM-in-exile in December of that year, and survived the war to serve in the post-war Yugoslav Navy as Pionir then Zelengora.

Zmaj
The German-built seaplane tender Zmaj was commissioned into the KM in 1930, but was converted to a minelayer in 1937. Captured by the Germans in April 1941, she saw service in the seaplane tender, aircraft rescue and troop transport roles as Drache. In late 1942, she was re-commissioned as a minelayer, and was used for shipboard trials with helicopters in 1943 before being sunk in September 1944.

Malinska class

In April 1941, they were all captured by the Italians, although one had been scuttled, it was raised and repaired. Two were captured by the Germans at the time of the Italian capitulation in September 1943, and were lost in their hands or while serving with the Navy of the Independent State of Croatia. Three were handed back to the KM-in-exile and survived the war to see service in the new Yugoslav Navy.

Minesweepers
At the time of its formation in 1921, the KM obtained four former Austro-Hungarian s that had been converted into minesweepers. Three were discarded soon after, but one served as a training vessel until the April 1941 invasion, at which time she was captured by the Italians. The Germans captured her in September 1943 and she was lost in their hands some time later.

Submarine tenders
Two submarine tenders were operated by the KM, one was converted from a German-built water tanker obtained from the Austro-Hungarians, and the other was a British commercial vessel converted to the role at the time British-built submarines were acquired. The latter ship was captured by the Italians in April 1941 but survived the war to see service in the post-war Yugoslav Navy.

Salvage ships
The KM operated two salvage ships. The first was a former Austro-Hungarian vessel which was scrapped in the late 1920s. She was replaced by a German-built ship.

Tankers
The KM had two tankers, one for oil and one for water. The oil tanker was sunk in Italian hands in 1943, and the water tanker was deleted at the end of the war.

River flotilla

The KM inherited four river monitors from the Austro-Hungarian Navy, each from a different class. In April 1941, one was sunk, and the rest were scuttled. One of the scuttled ships was raised and scrapped. The other two were raised and put to use by the Navy of the Independent State of Croatia, and were lost late in the war, with one being raised after the war and put into service until 1962.

See also 
 List of ships of the Yugoslav Navy

Notes

Footnotes

References

Books

Journals

Websites